Vanja Ilić (born 25 February 1993) is a Serbian handball player for C' Chartres MHB and the Serbia national team. He is the younger brother of fellow handball player Nemanja Ilić.

Career
After playing for PKB, Ilić signed with Partizan in June 2011. He spent four seasons at the club, before moving abroad to Macedonian side Rabotnički. A year later, Ilić rejoined Partizan, but quickly returned to Macedonia to play for Metalurg Skopje.

At international level, Ilić won a silver medal with the Serbian team at the 2015 Summer Universiade and participated in two European Championships (2018, 2020) and one World Championship (2019).

Honours
Partizan
 Serbian Handball Super League: 2011–12
 Serbian Handball Cup: 2011–12, 2012–13
 Serbian Handball Super Cup: 2011, 2012

References

External links
 EHF record
 LNH record

1993 births
Living people
Handball players from Belgrade
Serbian male handball players
RK Partizan players
Liga ASOBAL players
Expatriate handball players
Serbian expatriate sportspeople in North Macedonia
Serbian expatriate sportspeople in Spain
Serbian expatriate sportspeople in France
Universiade medalists in handball
Universiade silver medalists for Serbia
Medalists at the 2015 Summer Universiade